"Eye of the Beholder" is a song by the American heavy metal band Metallica. It was released on October 30, 1988, as the second single from their fourth studio album, ...And Justice for All.

Lyrically, the song concerns imposed limitations on freedom of speech and freedom of expression in general. "Eye of the Beholder" is notable for its chorus section containing  time played, not as an ordinary compound quadruple time, but as a syncopated rhythm. The rest of the song is a more conventional  rhythm at a slower tempo than that seen on Metallica's previous three albums.

The song has not been performed live in its entirety since 1989. It has, however, always formed part of the medleys of songs from …And Justice for All often played by the band in concert during the 1990s as an alternative to playing full songs, many of which were seen as too difficult because of the numerous guitar parts. One such "Justice Medley" was featured on its 1993 live album Live Shit: Binge & Purge.

In a September 2020 interview with Vulture, Lars Ulrich stated that he is "not a huge fan of that song", calling it "forced" and citing its two different tempos.

Personnel
Metallica
 James Hetfield – rhythm guitar, vocals
 Kirk Hammett – lead guitar
 Lars Ulrich – drums
 Jason Newsted – bass

Track listing

Cover versions
In Flames recorded a cover of "Eye of the Beholder" on Metal Militia: A Tribute to Metallica, a tribute album recorded by various artists. This version of the song also appears on the remastered edition of In Flames' first EP, Subterranean. A cover of the song also appeared on the Metallic Attack: The Ultimate Tribute tribute album, performed by Life After Death, a band formed by Phil Sandoval after the break-up of Armored Saint.

References

Eye of the Beholder (song)
Eye of the Beholder (song)
Songs written by James Hetfield
Songs written by Lars Ulrich
Songs written by Kirk Hammett
Works about freedom of expression